Misato, Saitama may refer to:

 Misato, Saitama (city), in Saitama Prefecture
 Misato, Saitama (town), in Kodama District, Saitama Prefecture